The Ardmore Junction station is a SEPTA transit station in Havertown, Pennsylvania. It serves the Norristown High Speed Line and SEPTA Route 103 bus. 

The trolley stop is elevated, with the bus stop below on the Ardmore Busway. Ardmore Junction is on Haverford Road.

History
The Philadelphia and Western Railroad began stopping at this transit location in 1907 as part of the railroad's plans to connect Philadelphia with Parkesburg. The 103 bus right-of-way was once part of the Ardmore branch of the Red Arrow trolleys, but it was paved to make way for buses when the trolley line was discontinued in 1966. 

The Norristown Line bridge was rebuilt circa 1992 during system-wide renovations.

In popular culture
This Philadelphia-area band Ardmore Junction, whose 1990s theme song was "High Speed Line," was named after the Ardmore Junction station—the station traveled to by guitarist Dan Mason to connect with fellow band member Kevin Shober.

Station layout

SEPTA suburban bus connections
The following SEPTA Suburban Division bus routes serve this station:
SEPTA Route 103

Gallery

References

External links

SEPTA Norristown High Speed Line stations